The 2012 Tour of Britain was the ninth running of the current Tour of Britain and the 73rd British tour in total. The race consisted of eight stages, starting on 9 September in Ipswich, and finishing on 16 September in Guildford. The race was part of the 2012 UCI Europe Tour, and was categorised by the UCI as a 2.1 category race.

The race was originally won by  rider Jonathan Tiernan-Locke, who became the first British rider to win the race in its current guise and the first to win a British tour since Chris Lillywhite won the 1993 Milk Race. Tiernan-Locke assumed the race lead with a second-place finish on the sixth stage and maintained the lead until the end of the race. He won by eighteen seconds ahead of Australia's Nathan Haas, who rode for the  squad, and the podium was rounded out by 's Damiano Caruso, who finished five seconds behind Haas and twenty-three seconds in arrears of Tiernan-Locke. In 2014 however, following investigation for biological passport irregularities, Tiernan-Locke was banned for two years and stripped of his 2012 victory.

In the race's other classifications,  rider Boy Van Poppel won the points classification for the most consistent finisher in each of the stages; despite not winning any stages, Van Poppel placed four times inside the top three placings of a stage. The mountains classification was won by a  rider for the second year in succession, as Kristian House succeeded Tiernan-Locke as the winner; the sprints classification was won by Peter Williams of the  team, while  won the teams classification.

Teams
Two-time Giro d'Italia winner Ivan Basso also contested the race for  – the squad making their début in the race – and Samuel Sánchez also competed in the race for the first time as part of the  team. Among the domestic teams, Jonathan Tiernan-Locke was the designated leader of the  team.

Stages

Stage 1
9 September 2012 – Ipswich to Royal Norfolk Showground, 

The opening stage of the 2012 Tour of Britain was a primarily flat stage, with the first of the Yodel intermediate sprint points coming in the village of Melton, before the first Škoda King of the Mountains climb came in another Suffolk village, in Snape. The second King of the Mountains point came at the village of Westleton, with the second sprint coming in Great Yarmouth. The final sprint was at Coltishall, with the final King of the Mountains climb coming at Swanton Morley; all three climbs during the stage were third-category ascents.

Martias finished first at two of the three sprints, and thus took the race's first sprints jersey, while House earned the polka-dot jersey for heading the mountains classification, and Wytinck earned the award for the day's most combative rider. The breakaway, which had an advantage of seven minutes over the field at one point during the stage, was caught with around  remaining, which was expected set up a sprint finish at the Royal Norfolk Showground. However, a large crash with around  remaining delayed a large portion of the peloton, leaving few riders to contest the final sprint;  rider Luke Rowe prevailed to take his first professional victory ahead of Clarke's team-mate Boy Van Poppel and 's Russell Downing. Rowe took the first leader's jersey by three seconds ahead of Martias, who was sixth on the stage but moved up due to bonus seconds from the intermediate sprints.

Stage 2
10 September 2012 – Nottingham to Knowsley Safari Park, 

The first sprint point on the second stage was contested just over  into the stage, at Duffield. After the sprint point, there were three successive first-category climbs on the  parcours, coming at Cross o' th' Hands, Alstonefield and finally Morridge. The two final sprint points were at Chelford and Culcheth with the stage finishing, for the first time, at Knowsley Safari Park on the outskirts of Liverpool. The breakaway for the stage consisted of six riders, and they managed to remain off the front of the field for the majority of the stage.

There were several late-stage attacks from riders representing the domestic teams, but it was ultimately a sprint finish within the safari park for the stage honours.  were on the front with race leader Luke Rowe leading out Cavendish, but the pair became separated in the closing stages, allowing Boy Van Poppel and Bobridge's team-mate Leigh Howard into space. Howard beat a recovering Cavendish to the line for his first win of the year, while a third place for Van Poppel, compared to a tenth for Rowe – with a one-second time gap – allowed Van Poppel to take the lead in the general and points classifications from Rowe. This was despite Rowe receiving the leader's jersey during the post-stage podium ceremonies.

Stage 3
11 September 2012 – Jedburgh to Dumfries, 

The third stage of the race started with an almost immediate sprint point,  into the stage at Hawick. Like the second stage, there were three successive King of the Mountain points, with two first-category climbs and a second-category climb coming at Roberton, Turner Cleuch and Grey Mare's Tail respectively.

Williams was looking to defend his lead in the sprints classification, while House was out to regain the lead in the mountains classification, that he had lost the previous day to  rider Pablo Urtasun. House ultimately regained his mountains lead with a first and two seconds – both to Sulzberger – while Williams extended his lead with two intermediate sprint wins.

The peloton had given them a maximum advantage of four minutes during the stage, before gradually pulling them back, being led by the  team of race leader Boy Van Poppel. Hawkins and Kreder left their breakaway companions behind on the finishing loop around Dumfries, while  rider Sep Vanmarcke attacked out of the peloton to join up with the two leaders around  later. With a lead-out from opening stage winner Luke Rowe, Cavendish took victory in Dumfries for the second consecutive year, ahead of  pairing Leigh Howard and Aidis Kruopis. With six bonus seconds on the line, Howard assumed the overall lead of the race, with Cavendish level on time; Van Poppel fell to third but held on to the lead of the points classification.

Stage 4
12 September 2012 – Carlisle to Blackpool, 

The fourth stage of the race started in Carlisle, where two sprints and two King of the Mountain points were all contested within the first  of the stage. The first two sprint points were held at Shap and Kendal, interspersed with two-second-category climbs at Shap Fell and Old Hutton. The final sprint of the day was situated at Caton and the final King of the Mountain point of the day was the third-category climb at Quernmore. The stage finished on the Golden Mile in Blackpool, where André Greipel had won the most recent finish there in the race-opening stage in 2010; the stage scheduled to finish in Blackpool in 2011 was cancelled due to inclement weather conditions after the remnants of Hurricane Katia hit the country. The main breakaway of the day was initiated during the opening kilometres of the stage, and involved six riders.

McLaughlin and Craven pushed on together off the front, before they were caught with  remaining. Cavendish assumed the race lead from Howard by six seconds, having previously stated that he did not want to hold the leader's jersey, to remain in the world champion's jersey ahead of defending his title in Valkenburg in the Netherlands.

Stage 5
13 September 2012 – Stoke-on-Trent to Stoke-on-Trent, 

For the fifth successive year the Tour of Britain held a stage in Stoke-on-Trent, with the fifth stage of the race commencing at Trentham Gardens. The first sprint of the day was contested at only  into the stage, at Stone. The second sprint point was situated at Uttoxeter and the final such point was located at Rocester. There were three categorised climbs during the stage, with two-second-category climbs coming in Glacial Boulder – at Cannock Chase – and Oakamoor respectively, while there was also a first-category climb at Gun Hill.

Strong crosswinds at this point allowed the main field to split apart, forming echelons, and also allowed a group of 21 riders to break clear of the peloton, and ultimately joined up with Basso and Huzarski after Sulzberger was dropped to form a 23-man group. Thirteen of the race's seventeen teams were represented in the group, including four members – Howard, Boy Van Poppel and  pairing Sep Vanmarcke and Nathan Haas – of the overnight top ten in the general classification.

Cavendish eventually lost almost twelve minutes on the day, comfortably losing his race lead. Galland had to abandon the race with a fractured collarbone. Galland's team-mate Jérôme Coppel then put in an attack on the group, closely followed by Haas before this was chased down. Vanmarcke beat out Van Poppel, Haas and Howard for second place, with Howard retaking the leader's gold jersey by seven seconds ahead of Van Poppel.

Stage 6
14 September 2012 – Welshpool to Caerphilly, 

The sixth stage started and ended in Wales with a profile similar to the Welsh stages that had been held during previous Tours of Britain, while it was also denoted as the queen stage of the race. Stage 6 also marked one of the hardest days in terms of climbing, with four first-category climbs at Cwm Owen, Brecon Beacons, as well as two ascents of Caerphilly mountain.

House continued to extend his mountains classification lead by taking the first two climbs of the day, while the peloton remained four minutes behind at the Brecon Beacons, although the group splintered on the descent from the climb – with eleven riders going clear – before eventually coming back together before the Mountain Ash intermediate sprint. At the foot of Caerphilly mountain, 's Jonathan Tiernan-Locke attacked out of the peloton, surpassing the remnants of the breakaway, with only Briggs catching up with Tiernan-Locke. 's Leopold König linked up with the leaders from a small chasing group, while Ghyllebert tried to rejoin the leaders before being dropped again. Briggs was also dropped with König and Tiernan-Locke remaining clear until the end, where König won the stage and Tiernan-Locke assumed the leader's gold jersey, after 's Leigh Howard finished 33 seconds behind on the stage.

Stage 7
15 September 2012 – Barnstaple to Dartmouth, 

The penultimate stage of the 2012 Tour of Britain started in north Devon, and contained two first-category climbs at Merrivale and Coffin Stone, as well as a second-category climb at South Hill. The day's intermediate sprint points were heavily favoured towards the latter part of the stage, with the final two sprints both coming within the final  of the stage. These were situated at Kingsbridge Promenade and Slapton Ley, with the day's first sprint contested at Great Torrington; the field had remained as one complete entity until this point, where Leigh Howard of  reduced the overall lead of  rider Jonathan Tiernan-Locke by three bonus seconds to ten seconds.

After that, the race split apart on the first climb at South Hill, before eventually reforming; the breakaway was formed during this phase of the race, with ten riders eventually going clear at the front. They eventually established an advantage of around four minutes at its maximum before Tiernan-Locke's squad along with  started bringing them back at a gradual rate, falling to 1' 20" with around  before the advantage started to increase once again. Their group eventually finished 46 seconds down on the stage-winning group of four riders, who had remained out front from the breakaway; Pablo Urtasun took his first win of the season for  ahead of fifth stage winner Marc de Maar, Caruso's team-mate Ivan Basso and team-mate of Urtasun, Samuel Sánchez.

Stage 8
16 September 2012 – Reigate to Guildford, 

The final stage of the 2012 Tour of Britain contained four categorised climbs: two third-category climbs at Staple Lane and Crocknorth Road, a second-category climb at Leith Hill and a final first-category climb at Barhatch Lane. Early in the stage there were two sprint points: the first at Dorking just over  into the stage, the second on the High Street in the finish town of Guildford; the final sprint of the 2012 Tour was at Ockley.

The break only got three minutes clear before the peloton gradually brought them back. On the final categorised climb of the race, Barhatch Lane, the overall leader Jonathan Tiernan-Locke ramped up the pace and split the main field for a time before it eventually reformed on the descent. Bobridge attacked on his own with  remaining of the stage, pulling clear by around half a minute before  set up station on the front of the peloton to keep Mark Cavendish out of trouble ahead of a likely sprint finish. After Bobridge was caught, three other riders tried solo attacks on the run-in to Guildford without success; setting up the sprint finish, Luke Rowe led it out for Cavendish again, and Cavendish won the sprint – for his third win of the race – by several bike lengths ahead of 's Boy Van Poppel, who secured the points classification on the line. Tiernan-Locke finished within the peloton to secure the overall victory.

Classification leadership

Final standings

General classification

Points classification

King of the Mountains classification

Sprints classification

Team classification

References

External links

2012
2012 UCI Europe Tour
2012 in British sport
September 2012 sports events in the United Kingdom